Lincoln Center Education (LCE), is the education division of Lincoln Center for the Performing Arts. Founded in 1975 as the Lincoln Center Institute.

In 2013, the former Lincoln Center Institute received a $4 million grant from the Sherman Fairchild Foundation to support a rebranding effort and new programs. The institute was subsequently renamed Lincoln Center Education. It focuses on K-12 arts education programs; higher education partnerships to train arts  education teachers; family and community outreach programs; a dedicated institute for arts education research and professional development; a consultancy branch; and a season of nine to twelve dance, music, and theatre presentations produced exclusively for young audiences.

Facilities 
Clark Studio Theater
Samuels Teaching Studio
Heckscher Foundation Resource Center

See also 
John Dewey
Experiential education

References

External links 

Lincoln Center